Lyuban may refer to:
Lyuban, Belarus, a town in Minsk Oblast, Belarus
Lyuban, Russia, name of several inhabited localities in Russia

See also
Lubań, name of several inhabited localities in Poland